Miriam Christine Borg is a Maltese pop and rhythm and blues singer  best known for representing Malta in the Eurovision Song Contest 1996.

Miriam Christine was born in Santo Antônio do Descoberto, Goiás, Brazil but raised on the Mediterranean island of Gozo. She took part in various singing festivals before winning the Song for Europe Festival  and representing Malta in the 1996 Eurovision Song Contest with the song In a Woman’s Heart.

On the night of the contest, held in Oslo, she was backed by 3 vocalists-one of whom was Georgina Abela, the wife of the composer and a former contestant. In the beginning of the voting Malta was among the top 5 but gradually fell to 10th place with 68 points.

Recent projects
Miriam Christine remains active as a singer in her native country, performing in weddings and on local television shows. In 2008 she formed The Gozo Children’s Choir  and performed during the Malta Gay Pride celebrations.

Discography

Singles

Albums

See also
Malta in the Eurovision Song Contest

References

External links
The official site of the Eurovision Song Contest

1978 births
Living people
Maltese people of Brazilian descent
20th-century Maltese women singers
20th-century Maltese singers
Eurovision Song Contest entrants for Malta
Eurovision Song Contest entrants of 1996
People from Goiás
21st-century Maltese women singers
21st-century Maltese singers